The Highlands North Nistoric District encompasses the historic heart of Highlands, North Carolina, a summer resort town high in the state's western mountains.  Its  include some of the first permanent year-round settlements in the town (established 1875), as well as a high concentration of its oldest surviving structures.  It is laid out north of Main Street, the commercial heart of the town, roughly between North 4th Street (United States Route 64) and North 5th Street.

The district was listed on the National Register of Historic Places in 2011.

See also
National Register of Historic Places listings in Macon County, North Carolina

References

Historic districts in Macon County, North Carolina
Historic districts on the National Register of Historic Places in North Carolina
Buildings and structures in Macon County, North Carolina
National Register of Historic Places in Macon County, North Carolina